The Kitsu Plateau is a lava plateau in northern British Columbia, Canada, located east of Mess Lake in Mount Edziza Provincial Park and Recreation Area.  It is named in association with Kitsu Peak and Kitsu Creek.  Kitsu in the Tahltan language is the word for the northern lights.

See also
Volcanism of Western Canada
Mount Edziza volcanic complex

References

Lava plateaus

Volcanism of British Columbia
Tahltan Highland